Robert Fisher (fl. 1490s – 1510s) was a Canon of Windsor from 1509 to 1510

Career

He was educated in Paris where he was taught by Desiderius Erasmus.

He was appointed:
Chaplain to the King
Vicar of Warkworth 1495
Rector of Chedzoy, Somerset 1508

He was appointed to the eighth stall in St George's Chapel, Windsor Castle in 1509 and held the canonry until 1510.

Notes 

Canons of Windsor